Vöran is a comune (municipality) in South Tyrol in northern Italy, located about  northwest of the city of Bolzano.

Geography

The municipality of Vöran contains the hamlet of Aschl.

Vöran borders the following municipalities: Hafling, Mölten, Merano, Burgstall, and Sarntal.

History

Coat-of-arms
The emblem is tierced per fess: the first of azure, the second a yoke on or and the third of gules. The insignia symbolize some peculiarities of the municipality. The yoke is referred to the cattle-breeding and the agriculture, the red to the mountains rich in porphyry and the azure to the blue-sky. The emblem was granted in  1967.

Society

Linguistic distribution
According to the 2011 census, 97.90% of the population speak German and 2.10% Italian as first language.

Demographic evolution

References

External links

 Homepage of the municipality

Municipalities of South Tyrol